Thomas Henry Link (15 December 1918 – May 1990) was an English professional footballer who played as a right winger.

Career
Born in Halifax, Link played minor football before joining Bradford City in May 1948. During his time with Bradford City he made six appearances in the Football League.

Sources

References

1918 births
1990 deaths
English footballers
Bradford City A.F.C. players
English Football League players
Association football wingers